Marcus Welby, M.D. is an American medical drama television series that aired on ABC from September 23, 1969, to July 29, 1976. It starred Robert Young as the title character, a family practitioner with a kind bedside manner, who made house calls and was on a first-name basis with many of his patients; James Brolin as his partner Steven Kiley, a younger doctor; and Elena Verdugo as Consuelo Lopez, Welby and Kiley's dedicated and loving nurse and office manager.

Marcus Welby, M.D. was produced by David Victor and David J. O'Connell through Universal Television, which was then an MCA company. The pilot, titled "A Matter of Humanities", had aired as an ABC Movie of the Week on March 26, 1969.

Overview
As with most medical dramas of the day, the plots often concerned a professional conflict between well-meaning physicians. Here, Welby's unorthodox way of treating patients was pitted against the more straight-laced methods of Kiley (Brolin). The catch with this particular program was that the roles were reversed in that Kiley was much younger than Welby. The opening credits of each episode reminded viewers of the generation gap between the two doctors, Welby driving his sedan and Kiley riding a motorcycle. Welby had served in the US Navy as a doctor during the war, and was a widower.

The doctors worked alongside each other in their private practice in Santa Monica, California, regularly working in conjunction with the nearby Lang Memorial Hospital. (This was later revealed in exterior shots to be the real-life Saint John's Hospital and Health Center in Santa Monica.) At the office, their loyal secretary-nurse and friend was Consuelo Lopez (Verdugo). Other characters that appeared throughout the series included Dr. Welby's frequent girlfriend Myra Sherwood (Anne Baxter), his daughter Sandy (originally Christine Belford, and later Anne Schedeen) and her son Phil (Gavin Brendan), and Kathleen Faverty (Sharon Gless), an assistant program director at the hospital, who worked closely with Welby and Kiley. Kiley met and married public relations director Janet Blake (played by Pamela Hensley) in 1975, at the beginning of the show's final season on the air.

In the episode "Designs", which aired on March 12, 1974, Young was reunited with his Father Knows Best co-star, Jane Wyatt; she played a fashion designer whose marriage to an embittered paraplegic led her to fall in love with the doctor while keeping her marriage a secret most of the episode.

Medical features
Its handling of many varied medical cases – some common, some uncommon – made it an instant hit for ABC. Story lines included impotence, depression, brain damage, breast cancer, mononucleosis, teenaged obesity, juvenile diabetes, sexually transmitted diseases, epilepsy, learning disabilities, leukemia,  haemophilia, paraplegia, dysautonomia, rape, Alzheimer's disease, and addiction to painkillers, among others. At its second season (1970–1971), it ranked number one in the Nielsen ratings, becoming the first ABC show to top the list. The same year, both Young and Brolin won Emmy Awards for their work, as did the show for Outstanding Dramatic Series. Young won a Golden Globe in 1972 for his performance. Members of the American Academy of Family Physicians served as technical advisers for the series and reviewed every script for medical accuracy.

Politics
The 1973 episode "The Other Martin Loring", was about a middle-aged man whom Welby advised to resist his homosexual impulses. The Gay Activists Alliance (GAA) zapped ABC, occupied its New York headquarters and picketed. The next year, "The Outrage" was a story of a teenaged student who was sexually assaulted by his male teacher, showing homosexuality with pedophilia. Seven sponsors refused to buy television advertising time, and 17 television network affiliates refused to air the episode. This was the first known instance of network affiliates refusing a network episode in response to protests.

In addition, an episode dealing with abortion was refused by San Diego area ABC affiliate XETV, a station licensed to Tijuana across the border in Mexico, due to that country's stance on the practice at the time.

Episodes

Crossovers with Owen Marshall, Counselor at Law
During its run, Marcus Welby, M.D. had two crossover stories with its legal spin-off series Owen Marshall, Counselor at Law. In "Men Who Care", Marshall defends the father of Welby's patient when the man is accused of murdering his daughter's boyfriend. In "I've Promised You a Father", Marshall defends Kiley in a paternity suit filed by a nurse claiming that Kiley is the father of her child.

Nielsen ratings

It was the first show in ABC's history to become the number-one show on television.

Cancellation
By the mid-1970s, the popularity of medical dramas began to wane. Ratings for both Marcus Welby, M.D. and CBS's Medical Center began to drop, as did the ratings for daytime dramas General Hospital and The Doctors. Previous episodes initially went into syndication in the fall of 1975 as Robert Young, Family Doctor (to avoid confusion with the first-run episodes still airing on ABC).  The show ended its run in 1976 after 169 episodes were made. On an awards show that year, Young joked publicly, "I knew that it was time to quit when I started taking time off to play golf!" In reality, his actual reaction to the show's cancellation did not become public knowledge in his lifetime, and remained largely unknown as of the middle of February 2022. Young's joke invoked a stereotype and trope about older doctors, with more time on their hands than they had had in their younger years, taking up golfing to occupy themselves.

Television movies
In 1984, the reunion movie The Return of Marcus Welby, M.D. aired, with Young and Verdugo reprising their roles. The major conflict, aside from interactions with patients, centered around Welby being accused of being too old to retain his medical license safely. Though Brolin was unavailable to reprise his role as Kiley, a statement described as being from him was read before the board that would decide Welby's fate. Another movie was made in 1988, Marcus Welby, M.D.: A Holiday Affair. This last made-for-television film was the last acting role of Robert Young's career.

Home media
Shout! Factory (under license from Universal Studios) has released the first two seasons of Marcus Welby, M.D. on  DVD in Region 1.

Mill Creek Entertainment released a 10-episode best-of set entitled Marcus Welby, M.D.: The Best of Season One on March 22, 2011.

References

Bibliography
 Alwood, Edward (1998). Straight News: Gays, Lesbians and the News Media. Columbia University Press. .
 Capsuto, Steven (2000). Alternate Channels: The Uncensored Story of Gay and Lesbian Images on Radio and Television. Ballantine Books. .
 Tropiano, Stephen (2002). The Prime Time Closet: A History of Gays and Lesbians on TV. New York, Applause Theatre and Cinema Books. .

External links

 (TV Movie/Pilot)

Encyclopedia of Television: Marcus Welby, M.D. 
Marcus Welby, M.D. episode guide

1969 American television series debuts
1976 American television series endings
1960s American drama television series
1970s American drama television series
American Broadcasting Company original programming
Best Drama Series Golden Globe winners
English-language television shows
1970s American medical television series
Nielsen ratings winners
Television series by Universal Television
Television shows set in Santa Monica, California
Primetime Emmy Award for Outstanding Drama Series winners